Fremont is a census-designated place in western Carter County, Missouri, United States. The community was founded circa 1887. As of the 2020 census it had a population of 43.

Demographics

History

Founding

The site of the town of Fremont was originally patented by Julius N. Russell. The claim was filed at Jackson, Missouri, on January 1, 1859. Like most communities that came to be in Carter County, Fremont's origins can be tied to the activity of the Missouri Lumber and Mining Company. In 1887 they granted the Current River branch of the Frisco Railroad a right-of-way across their land in Carter County. By July 3, 1888, the tracks were laid and the first train ran through the new town. The plat for the town was submitted to the county on July 10, 1888.

Name

The new town, which was laid out on land the railroad had acquired as part of its right-of-way through Carter County, was originally to be called "McDonald", after the chief engineer who had laid out the site of the town for the railroad. But the postal service rejected this name because it was too similar to McDowell, Missouri.

While trying to decide on a new name for the town, J. L. Greene suggested that it be called "Peggy" in honor of Peggy Snider, the wife of Dr. James Snider, one of the early pioneers of the region. This name was submitted to the postal service and accepted, and for many years Peggy was the name of the town.

In 1907 the name of the town was changed again, this time to Fremont, in honor of John C. Frémont (1813 - 1890), who was a famous explorer and soldier. Even after the name was changed to Fremont the town continued to be listed as Peggy on some maps for a number of years afterward, the 1911 Rand McNally & Co Atlas being one example.

Industry

About the only remnants of the towns industry are the railroad embankments. Ties and other uses of lumber fuelled the town through the turn of the 20th century.

After the need for iron diminished, the community dissolved, leaving only the smelter's smokestack and the Midco Cemetery on the hill east of the site as a reminder of the town's existence.

School

The school and approximately one-third of the town were devastated by a tornado in the spring of 1957. The old two-story brick school was in the direct path of the tornado and was completely destroyed. Fortunately, summer vacation had begun two days before. The storm hit just as students would have been dismissed for the day. The old school was not repaired, and what remained was torn down. A new elementary school was built on the same site, including a gymnasium. Work was completed in the summer of 1959, and was open for the school year of 1959-60.

The school was incorporated with Van Buren but kept its own mascot, the Fremont Indians. It was later used as a middle school for grades 6-8. During the late 1980s, the cost of transportation forced the school district to close the school.

References

Census-designated places in Carter County, Missouri
Unincorporated communities in Missouri